Joux is a commune in France.

Joux or de Joux may also refer to:

Joux Valley, Switzerland
Joux Lake, Switzerland
JOUX-DTV 3kW, a channel of the Niigata Television Network 21
La Joux, a frazione of La Thuile, Aosta Valley, Italy
Antoine Joux (born 1967), French cryptographer
Ferris de Joux (1935–2009), designer, engineer and constructor of sports cars